Temple Covenant of Peace (formally known as "'Brit Shalom'") is a Reform synagogue in Easton, Pennsylvania. Founded in 1839, it is one of the oldest synagogues in the United States. The Temple is currently in the process of merging with the B'nai Abraham synagogue.

History

Congregation Brit Shalom was founded on August 26, 1839.  In 1842, the congregation built a synagogue building at 38 South Sixth Street, and by the late twentieth century, it was used as the Second Baptist Church of Easton. In 1996, Mark W. Gordon identified it as the third oldest synagogue building in the country. However, the old synagogue burned down in 2003.

In 1959, the congregation, renamed Temple Covenant of Peace, moved to a new building.

References

External links
 

Easton, Pennsylvania
Religious organizations established in 1839
Reform synagogues in Pennsylvania
Religious buildings and structures in Northampton County, Pennsylvania
1839 establishments in the United States